The Austin Motor Company A series is a small straight-4 automobile engine. Launched in 1951 with the Austin A30, production lasted until 2000 in the Mini. It used a cast-iron block and cylinder head, and a steel crankshaft with 3 main bearings. The camshaft ran in the cylinder block, driven by a single-row chain for most applications, and with tappets sliding in the block, accessible through pressed steel side covers for most applications, and with overhead valves operated through rockers. The cylinder blocks are not interchangeable between versions intended for conventional end-on mounted gearboxes and the 'in-sump' transaxle used on BMC/BL front wheel drive models such as the Mini.  The cylinder head for the overhead-valve version of the A-series engine was designed by Harry Weslake – a cylinder head specialist famed for his involvement in SS (Jaguar) engines and several F1-title winning engines. Although a "clean sheet" design, the A series owed much to established Austin engine design practise, resembling in general design (including the Weslake head) and overall appearance a scaled-down version of the 1200cc overhead-valve engine first seen in the Austin A40 Devon which would form the basis of the later B-series engine.

The A-series design, along with particularly the B-Series, was licensed by Nissan of Japan. Many changes were made for the initial OHV Nissan E engine. An early change was to incorporate a 5 main bearing crank. The cylinder head was modified by swapping plugs and ports, plugs fitted between pushrods and 8 ports eliminated the Siamesed inlet and exhaust ports. Nissan modified the design into the later Nissan A engine that was launched in 1966 with an aluminium head and wedge combustion chambers. It became the basis for many of their following engines notably the later OHC Nissan E engine, was scaled up into Nissan CA engine and ultimately the DOHC  CA18DET as well as scaled down into the Nissan MA engine. All these engines show their lineage by the characteristic un-skirted crankcase block of the BMC A series, but with the A and E having the camshaft moved to the right side allowing greater port areas, and a mounting on the right wall of the crankcase for the oil pump whereas the BMC A series had the oil pump at the back end of the left-side camshaft.

Engine family list 
All engines had a cast iron head and block, two valves per cylinder in an OHV configuration and sidedraft SU carburettor. Engines were available in diesel in the BMC tractor.

All A-series engines up until mid-1970 were painted in British Standard (381c) 223 Middle Bronze Green. This does not include overseas production models such as Australian manufacture.
note* "factory/dealer warranty replacement" units were painted black, these were primarily distributed for the failures common to the "wet crank" primary gear system in early Minis.

A versions

803

The original A-series engine displaced just  and was used in the A30 and Morris Minor. It had an undersquare  bore and stroke. This engine was produced from 1952 to 1956.

Applications:

948
This was accomplished by increasing the bore to  while retaining the original  stroke. It was produced until 1964.

848

The  bore was retained for 1959s  Mini version. This engine was produced through to 1980 for the Mini, when the 998 A-Plus version supplanted it.

Applications:

997
The one-off  version for the Mini Cooper used a smaller  bore and longer  stroke. It was produced from 1961 to 1964.

Applications:

998
The Mini also got a  version. It was produced from 1962 to 1992. This engine was first introduced into the Mk II versions of the Riley Elf and Wolseley Hornet, before coming common fitment in the mainstream Minis.

1098
The  version was fitted to:

 MG Midget Mk1 1098cc from Oct 62- 64
 MG Midget Mk2 1098cc of 1964- 66
 Austin A35 Van 1098cc of 1962- 68
 Austin A40 Farina Mk2 - From Oct 62- 68
 Morris Minor from Oct 62- 71.
 Austin / Morris  BMC Saloon from 1962.
 Mini and its derivatives, the 1098cc engine mounted transversely.

It was a stroked (to ) version of the 998 previously used in the Riley Elf and Wolseley Hornet. It was produced from 1962 to 1980.

1070
The  version was another one-off, this time for the Mini Cooper S. It used a new  bore size and the  stroke from the 848. It was only produced in 1963–1964. Paired with the even rarer  version, below, it became that rarest of things: an oversquare A-series engine.

Applications:

970
The Mini Cooper S next moved on to a  version. It had the same  bore as the 1071 cc Cooper S but used a shorter  stroke. It was produced from 1964 to 1965.

Applications:

1275
The largest A-series engine displaced . It used the  bore from the Mini Cooper S versions but the  stroke from the plain Mini Cooper. It was produced from 1964 until 1980, when it was replaced by an A-Plus version. The bore size was around the maximum possible in the block, with very little separation between the middle cylinders, which often contributed to head gasket failures.

A-Plus versions

British Leyland was keen to update the old A-series design in the 1970s. However, attempts at replacement, including an aborted early-70s British Leyland 'K engine' (unrelated to the later Rover K series) and an OHC version of the A series, ended in failure. During the development of what was to become the Austin Metro, engineers tested the A series against its more modern rivals and found that it still offered competitive (or even class-leading) fuel economy and torque for its size. While in the 1970s the A series had begun to seem dated against a new generation of high-revving overhead cam engines, by the end of the decade a new emphasis on good economy and high torque outputs at low speeds meant that the A series's inherent design was still well up to market demands.

Given this, and the lack of funds to develop an all-new power unit, it was decided to upgrade the A-series unit at a cost of £30 million. The result was the 'A-Plus' Series of engines. More modern SU Carburettors and revised manifold designs allowed for small improvements in power without any decrease in torque or fuel economy. Many of the improvements learnt from the Cooper-tuned units were also incorporated, with A-Plus engines having a generally higher standard of metallurgy on all units, where previously only the highest-tuned engines were upgraded in this way. Studies were made into upgrading the engine to use five main crankshaft bearings but the standard three-bearing crank had proven reliable even in high states of tune and at high engine speeds, so it was not deemed worth the extra funding.

998 Plus
The A-Plus version of the  motor was produced from 1980 to 1992.

Applications:

1275 Plus
The larger  engine was also given the "A-Plus" treatment. This lasted from 1980 to 2000, making it the last of the A-series line.

1275 Turbo

To allow the MG Metro to compete with larger, more powerful hot hatchbacks a turbocharged version of the  A-Plus was developed with the assistance of Lotus Engineering. A Garrett T3 turbocharger was fitted along with a unique SU carburettor with an automatic pressure-regulated fuel system. The engine block, cylinder head, pistons, crankshaft and valves were all modified from the standard A-Plus engines. The turbocharger was fitted with an advanced two-stage boost control system which only allowed full boost to be achieved at engine speeds above 4000 rpm - this was to prevent damage to the sump-mounted four-speed gearbox, the design of which dated back to the early 1950s and could not reliably cope with the high torque output of the Turbo engine at low speeds. The quoted power for the  A-Plus Turbo was  although in practice the tune could vary from car to car and, because the engine was not intercooled power varied significantly depending on the weather.
Turbo versions lasted from 1983 to 1990.

Applications:

1275 MPi

A special "twin-port injection" version of the  engine was developed by Rover engineer, Mike Theaker. It was the last A-series variant, produced from 1997 to 2000. Few changes were made to ensure the engine complies with Euro 2 (later Euro 3) emission standard, such as adding a 3-way catalytic converter and making it twin-point injection, the engine also receive changes with ignition system by having a wasted spark instead of the distributor. For the Japanese domestic market. the engine maintained the single-point injection version of the engine and the radiator is still on the side due to the space constraint for the air conditioner component.

Applications

JOHN COOPER GARAGES

During the 1990s Mini Cooper revival, John Cooper Garages offered a number of factory-approved "Cooper S" and "Cooper Si" upgrades to the standard Coopers. The conversions came with a full Rover warranty, and could initially be fitted by any franchised Rover dealer.

 S pack (carb) 
 1st Si pack (Spi) 
 2nd Si pack (Spi) 
 3rd Si pack (Spi) 
 1997 Si pack (Mpi)  @ 5500rpm
 1999 Si pack (Mpi)  @ 6000rpm

Diesel version 
The diesel version appeared in 1962, on the BMC Mini tractor. It was developed with the help of Ricardo Consulting Engineers. It was redesign of existing 948 cc version, new purpose-designed cylinder head, with Lucas CAV fuel injection. This engine has dry liners. The block is almost identical to the petrol engine. The oil pump has been removed from the camshaft and is driven by an extension to what would have been the distributor drive. It uses Ricardo-patented "Comet V" combustion chambers, with a compression ratio of 23.6:1. Produced 15 hp at 2500rpm and  torque at 1,750 rpm. A petrol version of this modified engine was 'reverse-engineered' for use in the Mini Tractor whilst retaining parts commonality with the diesel variant, rather than using a standard petrol A-series unit. The diesel A series was also sold as a marine engine under the BMC name alongside the diesel B-series engines. Production ceased in 1969.

South African engines
At the end of 1965, BMC South Africa started a new program, with the aim of using more components manufactured in the country (using less imported components from U.K.). They decided to develop and manufacture their own version of the engine. Two versions were made with 1.1 and 1.3 litres, using the same cylinder block. The block was redesigned, new oil circulation arrangements and redesigned main bearing (bigger dimensions) and stronger/biffers camshafts. Both versions use the same connecting rods, but different crankshaft and pistons. Prototypes versions were made by 1969. Production began in 1971, ending in 1980.

OHC version 
With the intention of updating the current engine, for use in the new Mini Clubman (ADO20), and current ADO16, Leyland developed an OHC version. It appeared in a prototype version in 1971, with single overhead camshaft. It featured redesigned cylinder block, new aluminium cylinder head and twin SU carburetors. Eleven prototypes units were built, in three different capacities, 970, 1070 and 1275 cc. All engines use the same cylinder bore dimension of 70.6 mm, to reduce the number of engine parts, reducing production costs.  It uses a modular approach, making it possible to produce the three versions with the same engine block. The lack of investment and the turmoil and chaos in British Leyland, meant the engine never reached production. In 1975 the plan was abandoned in favour of the "A+" version that reached production in 1980.

Twin cylinder A-series 
Under the code ADO11, a 474cc twin cylinder with a single H2 SU carburetor based on the 948cc unit was built with the intention to be used in ADO15 (Mini) with an in-sump gearbox. In May 1957, the engine was tested in one Austin A35, alongside a 20 hp 500cc air-cooled later 670cc water-cooled 2-cylinder two-stroke engine developed by Dr Joe Ehrlich of EMC Motorcycles that was tested in one Austin A30 before being used in an experimental Austin A30 based prototype with weight reduced to 584 kg (by way of a special lightweight body in steel that was a couple of gauges lighter than normal with altered panels to keep weight at a minimum) known as the Austin A20 or the "Lightweight Austin 7".

In 2021 retired racing driver and Bugatti specialist Ivan Dutton rebuilt an example of the 4 stroke engine from an original head and cylinder block and documented the work on Youtube. He also has the EMC 2-cylinder two-stroke engine which he plans to return to running condition.

Current use 
This engine continues to be improved, it has a very large and wide market, whether this is classic car industry or racing industry. It has a wide OEM manufacturer support. Almost every part of the engine is still made, whether in original specification or improved versions, pistons, camshafts, crankshafts, cylinder heads. Cylinder heads are available in 8v or 16v, made in aluminium with 5, 7 or 8 ports. Additionally over the past few decades it has not been unusual to see the A-Series stretched beyond 1275cc with capacities ranging from as low as 1293cc up to 1479cc, although it is commonly enlarged to 1380cc while retaining its reliability so long it is serviced regularly and well looked after. 

The A series engine is currently used in David Brown Mini Remastered. The engine is totally rebuilt, with new internals to an improved specification. The engine used is based in 1275cc MPi version, with larger capacity versions including the 1330cc Monte Carlo  as well as the 1380cc and 1450cc Oselli Edition.

Gallery

See also 
BMC B-series engine
Rover K-series engine
Rover L-series engine
Tritec engine

References

Further reading

A-series
A-series
Gasoline engines by model
Straight-four engines
A-series engine